Bengt Anderberg (17 April 1920 – 24 September 2008) was a Swedish poet, novelist, editor and playwright.

Biography
Bengt Nikolas Anderberg was born in the neighborhood of  Lundby in Gothenburg, Sweden. 
From 1947 he was a regular critic for Bonniers litterära magasin and from 1950 for the cultural department of the newspaper Expressen  over a 48-year career. He was also a frequent collaborator in  diverse subjects which appeared in Expressen. Anderberg translated many collections of poems and plays and was a prolific translator of drama, both for radio and for the stage.

He made his literary debut in 1945 with the short story collection En kväll om våren. His novel Kain from 1948 led to a fierce debate. He was  editor-in-chief and also among the contributors to the 14 volume Kärlek, a series of erotic short story anthologies published between 1965-1970 by the Malmö-based book publisher Forsbergs förlag.  The first two had editions in English at Grove Press in 1969 as Love 1 and 2, Erotic Tales From Sweden and Denmark.

He was awarded the Svenska Dagbladet Literature Prize (1946), Boklotteriets stipendier till översättare (1951), Dobloug Prize (1985) and the  Elsa Thulins översättarpris (1998).

In 2014, the Bengt Anderberg Society was formed, which will work for the spread of the author's texts. It claims to be the only literary company based in Gothenburg.

Personal life
He was married  from 1947 to artist and ceramist Astrid Anderberg  (1927-2010). Together with his wife, he lived for many years  on the Danish island of Bornholm. He died at Rønne  in 2008.

References

1920 births
2008 deaths
Writers from Gothenburg
20th-century Swedish novelists
Dobloug Prize winners
Swedish children's writers
Swedish male poets
Swedish male novelists
Swedish male dramatists and playwrights
20th-century Swedish poets
20th-century Swedish dramatists and playwrights
20th-century Swedish male writers